Abasolo Municipality may refer to:
 Abasolo Municipality, Coahuila
 Abasolo Municipality, Guanajuato
 Abasolo Municipality, Nuevo León
 Abasolo Municipality, Tamaulipas

Municipality name disambiguation pages